Chestermere-Rocky View was a provincial electoral district in Alberta, Canada, mandated to return a single member to the Legislative Assembly of Alberta using the first-past-the-post method of voting from 2012 to 2019.

History

Boundary history 
Chestermere-Rocky View was created from large portions of the old electoral district of Airdrie-Chestermere and Foothills-Rocky View in the 2010 Alberta boundary re-distribution. The district surrounds the western, northern and eastern boundaries of the city of Calgary.

The electoral district was abolished in the 2017 electoral district re-distribution prior to the 2019 Alberta general election. The area east of Calgary (which contains a majority of Chestermere-Rocky View's population) will be transferred to Chestermere-Strathmore, the areas north of Highway 564 and east of Highway 2 will be transferred to Airdrie-East, the areas west of Highway 2 and north of the Bow River to Airdrie-Cochrane, and the areas west of Calgary (including the Tsuu T'ina Reserve) to Banff-Kananaskis.

Representation history
The electoral district's antecedents had elected Progressive Conservative (PC) candidates with solid majorities. However, in 2012, Chestermere-Rocky View was picked up by the Wildrose Party with one of the best results in the province for that party.

MLA Bruce McAllister subsequently crossed the floor to the PCs during the premiership of Jim Prentice with most of the Wildrose caucus. Although he was one of the few former Wildrose MLAs to win the PC nomination in his riding for the 2015 election, he was defeated by Wildrose candidate Leela Aheer by a slim margin.

Aheer then crossed the floor to the United Conservative Party (UCP) when the PCs and Wildrose decided to merge. She was named deputy leader of the UCP by leader Jason Kenney in late 2017. As the riding was set to be abolished in 2019, Aheer has indicated her intent to run in Chestermere-Strathmore.

In its short existence, Chestermere-Rocky View therefore elected Wildrose MLAs twice, but neither served their full term with the party.

Legislature results

2012 general election

2015 general election

Senate nominee results

2012 Senate nominee election district results

Student vote results

2012 election

See also
List of Alberta provincial electoral districts

References

External links
Elections Alberta
The Legislative Assembly of Alberta
Chestermere-Rocky View Electoral Division Information Profile 2015 - Alberta Legislature Library

Former provincial electoral districts of Alberta